The Säynätsalo Town Hall is a multifunction building complex, consisting of two main buildings organised around a centralised courtyard; a U-shaped council chamber and town hall with administrative offices and a community library with and flats. The Town Hall was designed by Finnish architect Alvar Aalto for the municipality of Säynätsalo (merged with the municipality of Jyväskylä in 1993) in Central Finland. Aalto received the commission after a design contest in 1949, and the building was completed in December 1951. 

The town hall is considered one of the most important buildings Aalto designed in his career.

Site 
In 1944 Aalto was commissioned to design and implement a town plan for Säynätsalo, a small factory town founded around Johan Parviaisen Tehtaat wood-processing mills, from 1946 operated by Enso-Gutzeit (now part of Stora Enso), whose headquarters in Helsinki he also designed. The town hall would be built at a later date after Aalto won a government-mandated competition for its design. Aalto constructed the building into the wooded hillside of Säynätsalo creating a three-story multi-purpose building surrounding an elevated courtyard.

Design 

The design of the Town Hall was influenced by both Finnish vernacular architecture and the humanist Italian renaissance.  It was the Italian Renaissance from which Aalto drew inspiration for the courtyard arrangement which informed the name of his original competition entry entitled "Curia." While the main program of the building is housed within a heavy brick envelope, the courtyard is bordered by a glass-enclosed circulation space which can be linked to the model of an arcade-bordered Piazza.

It was important to Aalto that the design represent democracy and the people's relationship with the government which is why he included a large public space, along with sections dedicated to the public.

The town hall is crowned by the council chamber, a double-height space which is capped by the Aalto-designed "Butterfly" trusses. The trusses support both the roof and the ceiling, creating airflow to manage condensation in the winter and heat in the summer. The butterfly truss eliminates the need for multiple intermediate trusses. It also gives call to medieval and traditional styles.  The council Chamber is approached from the main entrance hall a floor below via a ramp which wraps around the main tower structure under a row of clerestory ribbon windows.

Aalto constrained his material palette to one dominated by brick and accented by timber and copper. Though Aalto practiced at the same time as Modernist Architects Le Corbusier and others, he rejected the Machine Aesthetic for the majority of his architecture.  Instead, he saw his buildings as organisms made of up of individual cells. This principle informed Aalto's use of traditional building materials such as brick which is, by nature, cellular. The bricks were even laid slightly off-line to create a dynamic and enlivened surface condition due to the shadows.  

The massive brick envelope is punctuated by periods of vertical striation in the form of timber columns which evoke Säynätsalo's setting in a heavily forested area. Winfried Nerdinger argues that, "[Aalto] avoided a too perfect mechanical appearance. To this end, he insisted that the bricks should not be laid precisely to the plane. The result is a lively, natural-looking surface that acquires a sculptural quality in the light."

Another distinctive feature at Säynätsalo are the grass stairs which complement a conventional set of stairs adjacent to the tower council chambers.  The grass stairs also evoke notions of ancient Greek and Italian architecture through the establishment of a form resembling a simple amphitheater condition.

Plan 
Originally, the hall was planned as a multifunction space which would include civic offices and meeting space, private apartment space, shops, a bank, and a library.  The civic spaces are concentrated on the second floor on the west side of the building, surrounding the courtyard and leading to the council chamber.  The apartment spaces occupy both the first and second stories on the east end.  

Since the original construction, much of the multifunction spaces have been converted to allow for expanding office needs.

References 
Notes

Sources
Weston, Richard. Town Hall, Säynätsalo, Alvar Aalto. London: Phaidon Press Limited, 1993.

External links 

Official page of Säynätsalo Town Hall

Alvar Aalto buildings
Modernist architecture in Finland
City and town halls in Finland
Government buildings completed in 1951
Jyväskylä
Buildings and structures in Central Finland